The George W. DeLoach House is a historic home in Hagan, Georgia. The house was built in 1892 by George Wesley DeLoach and is an example of a Victorian style of architecture called "The New Planter Style". DeLoach was an early settler in Hagan and was instrumental in the creation of Evans County, Georgia. The house was placed on the National Register of Historic Places on June 28, 1982.

See also 

 National Register of Historic Places listings in Evans County, Georgia

References

External links 

 

Houses on the National Register of Historic Places in Georgia (U.S. state)
Victorian architecture in Georgia (U.S. state)
Houses completed in 1895
Houses in Evans County, Georgia
National Register of Historic Places in Evans County, Georgia